Telefónica Blue (also Sanya Lan, now Ocean Breeze) is a Volvo Open 70 yacht.

Career
She finished third in the 2008–09 Volvo Ocean Race skippered by Bouwe Bekking.

She finished sixth in the 2011–12 Volvo Ocean Race skippered by Mike Sanderson.

References
3. https://oceanbreeze.eu

Volvo Ocean Race yachts
Volvo Open 70 yachts
Sailing yachts of Spain
Sailing yachts of China